The Robinson Site, also known as NYSDHP Unique Site No. AO67-02-0001, is a  archeological site in Brewerton, New York.  Artifacts from Native American camps on the site have been found there.

Fluted projectile points were found on the Channing Robinson farm by archeologist William A. Ritchie in 1946.

References

Archaeological sites on the National Register of Historic Places in New York (state)
Geography of Onondaga County, New York
National Register of Historic Places in Onondaga County, New York